The XVIII Corps of the Ottoman Empire (Turkish: 18 nci Kolordu or On Sekizinci Kolordu) was one of the corps of the Ottoman Army. It was formed during World War I.

Balkan Wars

Order of Battle, October 29, 1912 
On October 29, 1912, the corps was structured as follows:

XVIII Provisional Corps (Thrace, under the command of the Second Eastern Army)
Yozgat Redif Division, Ankara Redif Division, Aydin Redif Division

World War I

Order of Battle, June 1915 
The corps was formed as the Right Wing Group of the Mahmut Kâmil Pasha's Third Army on June 7, 1915 and commanded by Halil Bey. In a rearrangement of operational field commands, Mahmut Kâmil Pasha redesigned this unit as the Provisional Halil Corps.

Right Wing Group (Caucasus, Commander: Kaymakam Halil Bey -> Mirliva Abdülkerim Pasha since July 19, 1915)
1st Expeditionary Force (Commander: Kaymakam Ali İhsan Bey)
5th Expeditionary Force (Commander: Kaymakam Bekir Sami Bey)
36th Division (Commander: Kaymakam Köprülü Kâzım Bey)

Order of Battle, Late Summer 1915 
On September 20, 1915, the Provisional Halil Corps was re-designated as the XVIII Corps of the Ottoman Army. In late Summer 1915, the corps was structured as follows:

XVIII Corps (Mesopotamia)
45th Division

Order of Battle, January 1916 
In January 1916, the corps was structured as follows:

XVIII Corps (Mesopotamia)
45th Division, 51st Division

Order of Battle, August 1916 
In August 1916, the corps was structured as follows:

XVIII Corps (Mesopotamia)
35th Division, 45th Division, 51st Division, 52nd Division

Order of Battle, December 1916 
In December 1916, the corps was structured as follows:

XVIII Corps (Mesopotamia)
45th Division, 51st Division, 52nd Division

Order of Battle, August 1917, January 1918
In August 1917, January 1918, the corps was structured as follows:

XVIII Corps (Mesopotamia)
14th Division, 51st Division, 52nd Division

Order of Battle, September 1918 
In November 1918, the corps was structured as follows:

XVIII Corps (Mesopotamia)
14th Division, 46th Division

Sources

Corps of the Ottoman Empire
Military units and formations of the Ottoman Empire in World War I
Ottoman Iraq